Sir John Chudleigh (1606 – April 1634) was an English politician who sat in the House of Commons in 1626.

Origins
Chudleigh was the eldest son of Sir George Chudleigh, 1st Baronet (d.1656) of Ashton, Devon, (whom he predeceased), and his wife Mary Strode, eldest daughter of Sir William Strode (died 1637), MP, of Newnham, Plympton St Mary, Devon.

Career
He matriculated at Wadham College, Oxford on 1 June 1621 aged 15 and was awarded BA in 1624 and MA in 1626. He was knighted at Plymouth as a captain on 28 September 1625. In 1626 he was elected Member of Parliament for East Looe. He was incorporated at Cambridge University in 1629.

Death
Chudleigh died at the age of about 28, in his father's lifetime, and his brother George succeeded to the baronetcy.

References

1606 births
1634 deaths
Members of the Parliament of England (pre-1707) for East Looe
English MPs 1626
People from Ashton, Devon